Acharacle is a village in Ardnamurchan, Lochaber, within the county of Argyll. It is in the Highland Council area of Scotland.

The place name is rendered Àth Tharracail in Scottish Gaelic, and means "Tarracal's ford". The Gaelic place name is composed of two world elements: àth ("ford") and the personal name Tarracal. This personal name is cognate to the Scottish Gaelic Torcall and the English Torquil, which are derived from the Old Norse Þorketill. According to Moidart tradition noted in the 19th century, Torquil was the leader of a force of Norse who were pursued by Somerled, and made a final stand at the riverside below Acharacle Manse, where they were slain.

References

Ardnamurchan
populated places in Lochaber